is a former professional tennis player from Japan.

Biography
Born in Ibaraki, Miyauchi played on the professional tour in the 1990s and had a best ranking of 115 in the world. 

Miyauchi partnered with Ai Sugiyama in the women's doubles at the 1993 Australian Open and featured in the women's singles main draw at the 1993 French Open.

She was a two-time quarter-finalist at the Asian Open, a WTA Tour tournament in Osaka, as well as reaching the quarter-finals of the 1991 Pattaya Open and 1994 Salem Open-Beijing. 

Her ITF titles include the $50,000 Gifu tournament in 1998.

ITF finals

Singles (3–3)

Doubles (1–2)

References

External links
 
 

1971 births
Living people
Japanese female tennis players
Sportspeople from Ibaraki Prefecture
20th-century Japanese women
21st-century Japanese women